Ongha Secondary School is a secondary school in the Ohangwena Region of Namibia. The school celebrated its 40th anniversary in 2018.

References

External links
 

Schools in Ohangwena Region